In enzymology, a precorrin-2 dehydrogenase is an enzyme that catalyzes the chemical reaction

precorrin-2 + NAD+  sirohydrochlorin + NADH + H+

The two substrates of this enzyme are precorrin-2 and NAD+; its three products are sirohydrochlorin, NADH, and H+.

This enzyme belongs to the family of oxidoreductases, specifically those acting on the CH-CH group of donor with NAD+ or NADP+ as acceptor.  The systematic name of this enzyme class is precorrin-2:NAD+ oxidoreductase. Other names in common use include Met8p, SirC, and CysG. This enzyme is part of the biosynthetic pathway to cobalamin (vitamin B12) in anaerobic bacteria and to Cofactor F430.

See also
 Cobalamin biosynthesis

References

 
 

EC 1.3.1
NADH-dependent enzymes
Enzymes of unknown structure